Northwood High School is a public high school in Northwood, Ohio.  It is the only high school in the Northwood Local School District.  Their nickname is the Rangers, with the school colors of blue and gold.  They are currently members of the Toledo Area Athletic Conference.

References

External links
School District Website

High schools in Wood County, Ohio
Public high schools in Ohio